The Kingston Formation is a geologic formation in England. It preserves fossils dating back to the Jurassic period.

See also

 List of fossiliferous stratigraphic units in England

References
 

Jurassic England
Oxfordian Stage
Jurassic System of Europe